The totality principle is a common law principle which applies when a court imposes multiple sentences of imprisonment. The principle was first formulated by David Thomas in his 1970 study of the sentencing decisions of the Court of Appeal of England and Wales:

Application

United Kingdom

Within the context of English and Welsh law, the totality principle is defined within the Criminal Justice Act 1991, that states that nothing in the Act "shall prevent the court ... in the case of an offender who is convicted of one or more other offences, from mitigating his sentence by applying any rule of law as to the totality of sentences". The principle was recognised in the Criminal Justice Act 2003 Section 166 (3)(b).

Sentencing guidelines are contained within the Coroners and Justice Act 2009, which states that the application of the principle are within the management of the Sentencing Council, applied along with the Offences Taken into Consideration (TICs). On 11 June 2012, the latest guidelines from the Sentencing Council came into force, which cover the three overarching aspects of sentencing: allocation; TICs; totality.

The principle of totality comprises two elements:

Resultantly, the suggestion for the application of concurrent or consecutive sentences is within the following gudielines:
Concurrent sentences: offences arise out of the same incident; there are a series of offences of the same or similar kind, specifically when committed against the same person. 
Consecutive sentences: offences arise out of unrelated facts or incidents; offences that are of the same or similar kind but where the overall criminality will not sufficiently be reflected by concurrent sentences; one or more offence(s) qualifies for a statutory minimum sentence and concurrent sentences would improperly undermine that minimum.

Australia

The totality principle is "well established" in the common law of Australia. The High Court quoted Thomas's formulation of the principle in Mill v R (1988).

As well as to prevent an excessive sentence, the principle is a product of two further principles "namely proportionality and mercy." 
Further, the principle must be applied "without a suggestion that a discount is given for multiple offences."

Canada

Section 718.2 applies the totality principle by stating that: c) where consecutive sentences are imposed, the combined sentence should not be unduly long or harsh; This is so as to "avoid sentences that cumulatively are out of proportion to the gravity of the offences." In application it requires Canadian courts to craft a global sentence of all offences that is not excessive. If the total sentence is excessive the court must adjust the sentence so that the "total sentence is proper".
 A sentence may violate the totality principle where:
The global sentence considerably exceeds the "normal" level of the most serious of the individual offences.
The global sentence "exceeds what is appropriate given the offender's overall culpability.

Hong Kong

Hong Kong Basic Law is based on the principles of English common law, and hence include the totality principle, which are applied by the Department of Justice.

New Zealand

The totality principle applies within New Zealand law. Aware of public concerns re perceived sentence discounting by the judiciary for multiple offences, the courts state that this assumes that offenders are "rational and well-informed calculators of the cost/benefit of committing offences", and hence see the correct application of the totality principle as "recognising a need to balance totality with deterrence and adequate denunciation of the conduct involved."

References

External links
Totality principle and guidelines at the Sentencing Council UK
Sentencing multiple offender, including the Totality principle at the New Zealand Ministry of Justice

Sentencing (law)
Legal doctrines and principles
Law of Australia
Law of Canada
English law
Law of Hong Kong
Law of New Zealand